Kathleen McCartney Hearst
is an American former triathlete who won the Ironman World Championship in February 1982.
She passed Julie Moss, who collapsed less than 10 yards from the finish line, and won the race. The New York Times credited the race with "raising the levels of enthusiasm and participation for the sport".

Results

Personal life
Hearst had three children and was living in La Jolla, California in 2004. Her daughter, Madeline, earned a rowing scholarship at University of California, Berkeley.
Hearst's nephew, Kevin Love, is a basketball player in the National Basketball Association (NBA).

Notes 

American female triathletes
Ironman world champions
Living people

Year of birth missing (living people)
21st-century American women